Carlos Arcesio Bianchi (born 26 April 1949), nicknamed El Virrey (The Viceroy), is an Argentine former football player and manager. A prolific goalscorer, although he had a bright career as a forward in Argentina and France, Bianchi is best known as one of the most successful coaches of all time managing Vélez Sarsfield and Boca Juniors to a great number of titles each. Bianchi is the only coach to win four Copa Libertadores. He is also the only coach to secure three Intercontinental Cups, and shares with Josep Guardiola and Carlo Ancelotti a joint-record of three club world championship titles. He most recently served as manager of Boca Juniors. Boca Juniors and Vélez Sársfield made him a statue.

Biography
Born in Buenos Aires, Bianchi was raised in a middle-class family. In 1972, he married Margaret Mary Pilla and they had two children: Mauro Carlos and Brenda. Now has four grandchildren: Paul, Carlos and Louis (who are sons of Mauro) and Mateo (son of Brenda and Huracán defender Eduardo Dominguez). His father worked in a sales position in which Carlos regularly helped until he made his debut as a player in first-division football for Vélez Sarsfield, the club which he was a fan of.

During his tenure as coach of Vélez Sarsfield he was known as the "Virrey" (viceroy, in Spanish), named by sports writer Victor Hugo Morales. The reason is based on footballing and historical grounds as Bianchi obtained several titles as a player and coach with Vélez Sarsfield. The club is located in the neighborhood of Liniers alluding to the Virrey Liniers, who was in command of the Viceroyalty of the Río de la Plata by early 1800.

Playing career

Beginning and consolidation 

Like some many other Argentine footballers, Bianchi gave his first steps playing "baby fútbol", a 5-a-side variant of futsal mainly played by children and youth, practised on smaller surfaces (usually parquetry, cement or synthetic grass). At 11 years old, Bianchi started playing for Club Ciclón de Jonte, a type of subsidiary of Club Atlético Vélez Sarsfield A representative of the club saw Bianchi's potential and took him to play at the youth divisions of Vélez Sársfield. By the time he was 16 yo, Bianchi had been promoted to the third division.

Bianchi was finally promoted to the first squad by Vélez Sarsfield manager Victorio Spinetto, making his debut with the team at the age of 18 in a 1–1 tie against Boca Juniors. One year later, Bianchi scored his first goal in Primera v Argentinos Juniors, on July 7, 1968. One week later, Bianchi broke the long standing Amadeo Carrizo's record of 769 minutes with his goal unbeaten.

With only 19 years old, Bianchi was part of the Vélez Sarsfield team that won the 1968 Nacional championship and was consecrated as the top scorer of 1970 Nacional championship with 18 goals and 1971 Metropolitano with 36. His good performances with the team and a serious injure of forward Omar Wehbe allowed Bianchi to be the centreforward of Vélez Sársfield.

European career 

In 1973 Bianchi was signed by Stade de Reims, a French team of Ligue 1. In his first season with the club, Bianchi was the top scorer of the league with 30 goals. Some of his most notable achievements in that year included the 6 goals scored in the 6–1 win over Paris Saint-Germain. Bianchi was seriously injured in a friendly match v Barcelona at Parc des Princes so he missed the season. After he recovered, Bianchi became the top scorer of the league once more, scoring 34 goals in 1975–76 and 28 in 1976–77.

During his tenure on Reims, Bianchi showed his scoring touch scoring 107 goals in four seasons and being the top scorer in the French championship in 1974, 1976 and 1977 marking 30, 34 and 28 goals, respectively. In 1977, he joined Paris Saint-Germain in which Bianchi was again the top scorer of the league in two seasons spent in the club. Because of the club's financial problems, Bianchi was transferred to Paris St. Germain in 1977.

In his first season with the Parisian club, Bianchi scored 37 goals in 38 matches, being also named best player of the season. The next season, 1978–79, Bianchi was the top scorer again with 27 goals. Despite of those outstanding individual performances, PSG did not achieve any title, on the contrary their performance was very poor, finishing 11th. and 13th. in the last seasons. Because of that, Bianchi chose to move to a more competitive team.

In the 1979–80 season he played for Racing Club de Strasbourg, without success, scoring only eight goals. Bianchi returned to his home country in 1980 to play for Vélez Sarsfield where he became top scorer in the 1981 with 15 goals. He would return to Stade de Reims where he would retire in 1984.

Bianchi is the top scorer in the history of Vélez Sarsfield with 206 goals and 9th overall in Argentine football. He is also the 9th top scorer in the history of the French League with his 179 goals. After his retirement, Bianchi is recognized by FIFA as Argentina's top scorer in the history of first division tournaments of the world scoring a total of 385 goals (206 in Argentina and 179 in France) surpassing Alfredo Di Stefano (377 goals) and Delio Onnis (352 goals, 53 in Argentina and 299 in France), a great merit not recognized by many due to his coaching career greatly overshadowing his days as a player. Carlos Bianchi is the 8th top scorer in the history of first-division football.

He also earned 14 caps for Argentina, scoring 7 goals, during the period from 1970 to 1972.

Return to Vélez Sarsfield 

At the end of the French season, Bianchi returned to his home country to play for Vélez Sarsfield, becoming the top scorer of 1981 Nacional with 15 goals. His last season in Argentina was in the 1984 Metropolitano, where he played his last match with Vélez Sarsfield, a 1–2 defeat to Boca Juniors at José Amalfitani Stadium on July 1, 1984. Bianchi remains as all-time top scorer for Vélez Sarsfield, with 206 goals in 324 matches with the team.

Retirement in France 
Bianchi returned to French football in 1984–85 to play for Stade de Reims, his first team in Europe which was playing in Ligue 2 (Second Division). Nevertheless the club did not make a good performance, finishing 12th. of group A. Bianchi was not the temible scorer of his glory days, either. He only scored 8 goals in the season and then retired from football. Nevertheless, Bianchi would stay in Reims after becoming manager of the team and being in charge during the 1985–86 season.

Managerial career

France 
Bianchi made his debut as manager in March 1985 with Stade de Reims (where he had previously retired as player), being three seasons in Second Division without achieving promotion to the Ligue 1 despite the team reached the semifinals of Coupe de France twice. After his tenure on Remis, Bianchi was hired by OGC Nice in Ligue 1, coaching the club in 24 matches between 1989 and 1990. Nice remained in the top division after beating Racing Strasbourg in playoff with an aggregate score of 7–3.

After Bianchi left Nice, he returned to Paris to coach Paris FC, where he stayed two years (1991–92).

Argentina 
Bianchi returned to Argentina in December 1992 to coach Vélez Sarsfield, the club where he had debuted, in replacement of Eduardo Luján Manera. His first match on the bench was on February 21, 1993, when Vélez beat Deportivo Español 2–0 with two goals by Omar Asad in the first round of the 1993 Clausura season. Vélez won that championship with 27 points in 19 matches played, achieving their 2nd. league title.

As Argentine champion, Vélez qualified to 1994 Copa Libertadores, where the team shared group with strong and experienced rivals such as Boca Juniors and Brazilian Cruzeiro, and Palmeiras. Nevertheless Vélez placed 1st. in the zone therefore the squad qualified to the next stage. Vélez would then eliminate Defensor, Minervén, and Atlético Junior to face defending champions São Paulo in the finals. After both teams won one game each by the same score (10), a penalty shootout was run to decide a champion. After José Luis Chilavert stopped one shot and Roberto Pompei scored, Vélez Sarsfield won the series achieving their first Copa Libertadores trophy.

The next step was the 1994 Intercontinental Cup, where Bianchi led Vélez Sarsfield to win their second international title after beating Milan 2–0.

Career statistics 
Bianchi is regarded as one of the best forwards of all time, because of his impressive record of goals scored both in France and Argentina. He is the all-time topscorer of Vélez Sarsfield with 206 goals. He is also the all-time top scorer of French Division 1 with 179 goals scored.

Club

Manager

Titles

Player
Vélez Sarsfield
Primera División (1): 1968 Nacional

Manager
Vélez Sarsfield
 Primera División (3): 1993 Clausura, 1995 Apertura, 1996 Clausura
 Copa Libertadores (1): 1994
 Intercontinental Cup (1): 1994
 Copa Interamericana (1): 1994

Boca Juniors
 Primera División (4): 1998 Apertura, 1999 Clausura, 2000 Apertura, 2003 Apertura
 Copa Libertadores (3): 2000, 2001, 2003
 Intercontinental Cup (2): 2000, 2003

Individual 
 Argentine Primera División Top scorer (3): 1970, 1971, 1981
 French Division 1 Top Scorer (5): 1973–74, 1975–76, 1976–77, 1977–78, 1978–79
 South American Coach of the Year (5): 1994, 1998, 2000, 2001, 2003
 IFFHS World's Best Club Coach (2): 2000, 2003

References

External links

Carlos Bianchi and the art of winning the Copa Libertadores at thesefootballtimes.co
Carlos Bianchi: "self-belief in the face of adversity" at FIFA.com
  

1949 births
Living people
Argentine footballers
Argentina international footballers
Argentine expatriate footballers
Argentine people of Italian descent
A.S. Roma managers
Serie A managers
Expatriate football managers in Italy
Atlético Madrid managers
Expatriate football managers in Spain
La Liga managers
Club Atlético Vélez Sarsfield footballers
Stade de Reims players
Paris Saint-Germain F.C. players
RC Strasbourg Alsace players
Association football forwards
Argentine football managers
Argentine expatriate football managers
Expatriate football managers in France
Stade de Reims managers
OGC Nice managers
Club Atlético Vélez Sarsfield managers
Boca Juniors managers
Footballers from Buenos Aires
Illustrious Citizens of Buenos Aires
Ligue 1 players
Ligue 2 players
Argentine Primera División players
Expatriate footballers in France
Argentine expatriate sportspeople in France
Argentine expatriate sportspeople in Spain
Argentine expatriate sportspeople in Italy